The Siege of Ostrovic was Mehmed the Conqueror's successful attack on the castle of Ostrovic in 1454 during his first Serbian campaign.

Before the siege 
After the death of Sultan Murad II and the conquest of Istanbul, the 
Serbian despot sent a delegation to the Ottoman ruler who was in Edirne. He presented the keys of some castles that belonged to the Ottomans, as well as congratulating the conquest. But at the same time, with the encouragement of the Pope, he had not neglected to meet with the Hungarians to participate in a new Crusade, which was intended to be prepared against the Ottomans. The Ottomans learned about the Serbian-Hungarian contacts of the Serbian despot against them through their spies and prepared accordingly.

Although the Ottoman court asked the Serbian delegation for the keys of the other castles, which belonged to them but passed to the Serbs, they also received the refusal. Thereupon, a campaign was made on Serbia in the Spring of 1454.

Siege 
Mehmet led this expedition in 1454. His intention this time was simply to cross enemy territory and destroy everything. During this fast expedition, thousands of prisoners were taken and brought to 
Istanbul as the new Christian population. Trapped in Smederevo, the cavalry sent against him by the despot (a Venetian visiting John Hunyadi says he had 9,000 horsemen) was easily repulsed. Mehmed the Conqueror arrived in Ostrovica, where Brankovic had many assets, and easily took the castle.

References 

Ottoman Empire military-related lists
Ottoman Empire-related lists
Military campaigns involving the Ottoman Empire
Battles of Mehmed the Conqueror